Pseudosphetta is a genus of moths of the family Erebidae. The genus was erected by George Hampson in 1926.

Species
Pseudosphetta fissigna Hampson, 1926 Thailand, Peninsular Malaysia, Sumatra, Borneo
Pseudosphetta moorei (Cotes & Swinhoe, 1887) Sri Lanka, Andamans, India, Thailand, Taiwan, Peninsular Malaysia, Sumatra, Borneo, Sulawesi, Seram
Pseudosphetta umbrosa Holloway, 2005 Borneo, Sumatra

References

Calpinae